The Defamation Act (Northern Ireland) 1955 (c. 11) (N.I.) is an Act of the Parliament of Northern Ireland. This Act makes similar provision for Northern Ireland as the Defamation Act 1952 which applies only to England, Wales and Scotland.

The power of the Northern Ireland parliament to make laws for purposes similar to the purposes of the 1952 Act derived from Section 15 of that law.

Section 1
This section was repealed by the Broadcasting Act 1990.

Section 3 - Slander of title, etc
See Malicious falsehood.

Section 4 - Unintentional defamation
This section was repealed by the Defamation Act 1996.

Section 7 - Qualified privilege of newspapers
This section was repealed by the Defamation Act 1996.

Section 8 - Extent of Law of Libel Amendment Act 1888 s.3
This section was repealed by the Defamation Act 1996.

Section 9 - Extension of certain defences to broadcasting
Sections 9(2) and (3) were repealed by the Defamation Act 1996.

See also
Defamation Act

References

External links

The Defamation Act (Northern Ireland) 1955, as amended from the National Archives.

Acts of the Parliament of Northern Ireland 1955
United Kingdom defamation law